The Wiskott–Aldrich Syndrome protein (WASp) is a 502-amino acid protein expressed in cells of the hematopoietic system that in humans is encoded by the WAS gene.  In the inactive state, WASp exists in an autoinhibited conformation with sequences near its C-terminus binding to a region near its N-terminus.  Its activation is dependent upon CDC42 and PIP2 acting to disrupt this interaction, causing the WASp protein to 'open'.  This exposes a domain near the WASp C-terminus that binds to and activates the Arp2/3 complex.  Activated Arp2/3 nucleates new F-actin.

WASp is the founding member of a gene family which also includes the broadly expressed N-WASP (neuronal Wiskott–Aldrich Syndrome protein), SCAR/WAVE1, WASH, WHAMM, and JMY. WAML (WASP and MIM like), WAWH (WASP without WH1 domain), and WHIMP (WAVE Homology in Membrane Protrusions) have more recently been discovered.

Structure and function 

The Wiskott–Aldrich syndrome (WAS) family of proteins share similar domain structure, and are involved in transduction of signals from receptors on the cell surface to the actin cytoskeleton.  The presence of a number of different motifs suggests they are regulated by a number of different stimuli, and interact with multiple proteins.  These proteins, directly or indirectly, associate with the small GTPase CDC42, known to regulate formation of actin filaments, and the cytoskeletal organising complex, Arp2/3.

The WASp family proteins includes WASp, N-WASp, SCAR/WAVE, WHAMM and WASH. The five of them share a C- terminal VCA (verprolin, central, acidic) domain where they interact with actin nucleating complex (ARP2/3) and they differ in their terminal domains. WASp and N-WASP are analogs, they contain an N-terminal EVH1 domain, a C-terminal VCA domain and central B and GBD (GTP binding domain) domains. WASp, is expressed exclusively in hematopoietic cells and neuronal WASp (N-WASp), is ubiquitously expressed. N-WASp contains an output region and a control region that are essential for its regulation. The output region is called the VVCA domain. It is located towards the C-terminal end of the protein and contains four motifs: two verprolin homology motifs (VV) binds actin monomers and delivers them to Arp2/3; the central domain (C) was once thought to bind cofilin but is now believed to enhance the interactions between the V domains and actin monomers, as well as the interaction between the A domain and Arp2/3; and the acidic motif (A) binds Arp2/3. In isolation, the VCA region is constitutively active.  However, in full-length N-WASp the control region suppresses VCA domain activity.   The control region is located at N-terminal end of N-WASp. The control region contains a CDC42-binding domain (GBP) and a PIP2-binding domain (B), both of which are critical for proper regulation of N-WASp. Cooperative binding of CDC42 and PIP2 relieve the autoinhibition of N-WASp, causing Arp2/3 to carry out actin polymerization. WASp interacting protein (WIP) interacts with WASp N-terminal domain (WH1) preventing it from degradation and stabilising its auto-inhibitory conformation.

In the absence of CDC42 and PIP2, N-WASp is in an inactive, locked conformation. Cooperative binding of both CDC42 and PIP2 relieve the autoinhibition. The cooperative binding of CDC42 and PIP2 is thermodynamically favored; binding of one enhances binding of the other. CDC42 and PIP2 localize the N-WASp-Arp2/3 complex to the plasma membrane. This localization ensures the actin polymers will be able to push through the plasma membrane and form filopodium required for cell motility.

WASp is required for various functions in myeloid and lymphoid immune cells. Many of these, such as phagocytosis and podosome formation, related to its role in regulating the polymerization of actin filaments. Other functions of WASP depend on its activity as a scaffold protein for assembly of effective signalling complexes downstream of antigen receptor or integrin engagement. Particularly in NK cells it participates in the synapse formation and polarization of perforin to the immune synapse for NK cell cytotoxicity. When WASp is absent or mutated T cells and B cells formation of immune synapse and TCR/BCR downstream signaling is also affected.

Clinical significance 
Wiskott–Aldrich syndrome is a rare, inherited, X-linked, recessive disease characterized by immune dysregulation and microthrombocytopenia, and is caused by mutations in the WASp gene.  The WASp gene product is a cytoplasmic protein, expressed exclusively in hematopoietic cells, which show signalling and cytoskeletal abnormalities in WAS patients.  A transcript variant arising as a result of alternative promoter usage, and containing a different 5' UTR sequence, has been described, but its full-length nature is not known.

WASp is a product of the WASp, and mutations in the WASp can lead to Wiskott–Aldrich syndrome (an X-linked disease that mainly affects males with symptoms that include thrombocytopenia, eczema, recurrent infections, and small-sized platelets) in these patients the protein is usually significantly reduced or absent.   Other, less inactivating mutations affecting the WASp cause X-linked thrombocytopenia, or XLT, where there is usually detectable protein levels by flow cytometry. The majority of the mutations causing classic WAS are located in the WH1 domain of the protein and these mutations affect binding with the WASp Interacting Protein. Mutations located in the GBD domain disrupt autoinhibition and lead to an unfolded protein that is constitutively active. Unlike WAS and XLT, WASp in this case is present and active. Activated WASp leads to nuclear localization of actin filaments and this can lead to premature apoptosis, aneuploidy and failure to undergo cytokinesis. This, in turn, causes myelodysplasia and X-linked neutropenia. 

A prospective gene therapy for Wiskott–Aldrich syndrome, OTL-103, uses autologous CD34+ lymphocytes that are transfected with a lentiviral vector to produce functional WASp. , OTL-103 was undergoing Phase I/II clinical trials at the San Raffaele Hospital in Milan, Italy.

Interactions 

Wiskott–Aldrich syndrome protein has been shown to interact with:

 CDC42, 
 CRKL,
 EGFR, 
 FGR, 
 FYN, 
 Grb2, 
 ITK 
 ITSN2, 
 NCK1, 
 PIK3R1, 
 PLCG1, 
 PSTPIP1, 
 Src, 
 TRIP10, and
 WIPF1.

See also 
Wiskott–Aldrich syndrome-like
cortactin

References

Further reading

External links 

GeneReviews/NIH/NCBI/UW entry on WAS-Related Disorders including Wiskott-Aldrich syndrome (WAS), X-linked thrombocytopenia (XLT), and X-linked congenital neutropenia (XLN)